Club Deportivo Berceo is a Spanish football team based in Logroño in the autonomous community of La Rioja. Founded in 1948, it plays in 3ª - Group 16. Its stadium is Estadio La Isla with a capacity of 2,000 seaters.

History 
In the 2018-19 season the club finished 14th in the Tercera División, Group 16.

Season to season

20 seasons in Tercera División

Famous players

 Javi Martínez
 Borja Viguera

References

External links
Official Website  
Futbolme team profile  

Football clubs in La Rioja (Spain)
Sport in Logroño
Association football clubs established in 1948
1948 establishments in Spain